The Naval Outlying Landing Field North Carolina is a proposed Naval Outlying Landing Field by the United States Navy that would service both Naval Air Station Oceana and Marine Corps Air Station Cherry Point.

History

Plans by the Navy to construct an outlying landing field supporting both Naval Air Station Oceana and Marine Corps Air Station Cherry Point in eastern North Carolina, initiated in 2006, have been met with fierce opposition by local residents and environmentalists. Concerns about the ecological impacts of the field, along with noise concerns voiced by residents, led to the abandonment of the initially planned sites for the OLF, along with a delay in the project's environmental impact statement.

In early 2011, the U.S. Navy announced it was suspending plans for the construction of the outlying landing field until at least 2014.

In November, 2013, the US Navy announced it was cancelling plans for a Navy OLF in North Carolina.

References

Proposed airports in the United States
North Carolina